Maddalena Corvina (1607-1664) was an Italian portrait and still life painter and engraver. Corvina specialized in miniature portrait paintings. Living and working in Rome, the House of Medici were patrons. She apprenticed under her uncle, Francesco da Castello. Anna Angelica Allegrini was a student of Corvina. Works by Corvina are held in the Albani Library. Corvina was the subject of a portrait by Claude Mellan in 1636.

Gallery

References

1607 births
1664 deaths
17th-century Italian painters
Painters from Rome
Italian women painters
Portrait miniaturists
17th-century Italian women artists